Arindam Chakrabarti is, currently, a visiting professor of philosophy at Ashoka University, India. He is, also, a professor of philosophy at Stony Brook University, where he has been since 2018. Prior to moving to Stony Brook, Chakrabarti taught at the University of Hawaii, where he was the director of the EPOCH Project (Eastern Philosophy of Consciousness and the Humanities).

Chakrabarti obtained his BA in 1976 and his MA in 1978, both from the University of Calcutta. He received his Ph.D. in 1982 from St. Anne's College at Oxford University. He held previously a teaching position at the University of Delhi.

Selected publications
Books

 Realisms Interlinked: Objects, Subjects and Other Subjects (24 chapters Monograph)— Contract Signed with Bloomsbury, London, published Sept, 2019.
 The Book of Questions: An Analytical Introduction to Indian Philosophy—Contract signed with Penguin Books, India. Forthcoming 2020.
 Bloomsbury Research Handbook of Indian Aesthetics and Philosophy of Art, February, 2017.
 Comparative Philosophy without Borders: Essays in Fusion Philosophy, co-edited with Ralph Weber, November, 2015, Bloomsbury-Continuum, London, UK.
 Engaged Emancipation: New Essays on Yogavāsiṣtha, Co-edited with Christopher Chapple, State University of New York Press, 2014.
 Mahābhārata Now: Narrative, Aesthetics, Ethics (Co-edited with Shibaji Bandyopadhyaya), Routledge India, and Indian Institute of Advanced Study, Shimla, 2013.
 Apoha: Buddhist Nominalism and Human Cognition (Co-edited with Mark Siderits and Tom Tillemans), Columbia University Press, New York, 2011. 
 Universals, Concepts, and Qualities: New Essays on the Meaning of Predicates, Ashgate Publishing, UK, May 2006, Co-edited with Sir Peter Strawson.
 Denying Existence (Book in the Synthese Library Series), Kluwer Academic Publishers, Dordrecht/Boston, 1997.
 Epistemology, Meaning and Metaphysics After Matilal (edited anthology), Indian Institute of Advanced Studies, Studies in the Humanities Series Vol. II, 1996.
 Knowing from Words (Co-edited with Bimal Matilal), Kluwer Academic Publishers, Synthese Library Series, 1993

Selected articles
 “Can there be a science of Meditation?” in Thinking with the Yoga Sutra of Patanjali, ed: Chris Chapple and Ana Funes (Lexington Books 2019)
“Meaning of Life in Vyasa (Mahabharata)” –invited refereed chapter in Meaning of Life and the Great Philosophers, ed by Stephen Leach et al, Routledge, 2018.
“Free Will in Indian Thought”—invited refereed chapter in The Routledge Companion to Free Will edited by, Kevin Timpe, New York : Routledge, Taylor & Francis Group, 2017.
“Welcome Home, through the Door: An Essay in Moral Phenomenology of Human Dwelling” in Locations: An Anthology of Architecture and Urbanism 01 (Annual of Architecture and Urbanism) Hardcover Dec 2016, Kazi K Ashraf (Editor) 
"Against the Error of Retaliation: A Philosophical Tribute to Ramchandra Gandhi", in Learning Non-Violence (ed) Gangeya Mukherji, Oxford University Press, Delhi, March 2016
“Refining the Repulsive: Towards an Indian Aesthetics of the Ugly and the Disgusting” in Bloomsbury Research Handbook of Contemporary Indian Aesthetics and Philosophy of Art, February, 2016.
“Is this a Dream? A Critique of Mokṣopaya’s Take on Experience, Objecthood and the External World” Chap. 4, in Engaged Emancipation, (Edited by Chris Chapple and Arindam Chakrabarti) SUNY Press, February 2015
“A Horrid Tree-House or a Charming City” Yogavāsiṣṭha on Spiritual Culture of the Body, in Engaged Emancipation, (Edited by Chris Chapple and Arindam Chakrabarti) SUNY Press, February 2015
“How Do We Read Others' Feelings? Strawson and Zhuangzi Speak to Dharmakīrti, Ratnakīrti and Abhinavagupta,” in Comparative Philosophy without Borders. (edited by Arindam Chakrabarti and Ralph Weber) Bloomsbury, 2015
“Possessions” in Studies in Humanities and Social Sciences, (ed) Rahul Govind, Journal of Indian Institute of Advanced Study, Shimla, India, 2014 
“Just Words: An Ethics of Conversation in the Mahābhārata”, in Arindam Chakrabarti and Sibaji Bandyopadhyay (eds) Mahābhārata Now. Routledge, Delhi, 2014
“The Unavoidable Void: Nonexistence, Absence, and Emptiness” in Jeeloo Liu, Douglas L. Berger (eds), Nothingness in Asian Philosophy, Routledge, 2014.
“Now Kali I shall Eat You Up: On the Logic of the Vocative” in Ramchandra Gandhi: The Man and His Philosophy (Ed): A. Raghuramaraju, Routledge, 2013
“On Debts, Duties, and Dialogue: The Vedas and Levinas on the Ethical Metaphysics of Hospitality”, in Mattice and Kalmanson (eds), Levinas and Asian Thought, Duquesne University Press, 2013.
“Why Pray to God who can Hear the Ant’s Anklets?”, in Sri Ramakrishna’s Ideas and Our Times: A Retrospect on His 175th Birth Anniversary, R.K. Mission Institute of Culture, Kolkata, 2013.
“Or”, in Madhabendranath Mitra, et al (eds), Studies in Logic: A Dialogue Between the East and the West, Sanctum Books, New Delhi, 2012. 
“Phenomenology of Fun and Boredom”, in Narasimha and Ahuja (eds), Dialogues Across Disciplines, National Institute of Advanced Study, Bangalore, 2012.
“Arguing from Synthesis to the Self: Utpala and Abhinavagupta Respond to Buddhist NoSelfism”, in Self Versus No-Self, Jonardon Ganeri and Chakravarthi Ramprasad (eds), London, Ashgate, 2012.
“A Critique of Pure Revenge”, in Passion, Death, and Spirituality: The Philosophy of Robert C. Solomon, (Sophia Studies in Cross-Cultural Philosophy of Traditions and Cultures), Springer 2012.
“The Connecting Manas: Inner Sense, Commonsense or the Organ of Imagination”, in After Appropriation: Intercultural Explorations in Philosophy and Religion, Morny Joy (ed), University of Calgary Press, 2011.
“New Stuff: On the Very Idea of Creativity in Philosophical Thinking”, in Contrary Thinking: Selected Essays on Daya Krishna, Jay Garfield, Nalini Bhushan, Daniel Raveh (eds), Oxford University Press, 2011.
“Troubles with a Second Self: The Problem of Other Minds in 11th Century Indian and 20th Century Western Philosophy”, in Subjectivity and Knowledge, Vol. 1, No. 1, 2011, of Argument, Journal of Pedagogical University, Krakow, Poland.
“A Horrid Tree-House or a Charming City? Yogavāsiṣḥa on the Body”, in Nature and Culture, Roddam Narasimha and Sangeetha Menon (eds), PHISPC, New Delhi, 2010.
“Non-Cruelty of Speech and the Hand: Hopes for Humanity Inspired by the Mahābhārata and the Buddha”, in Global Forum on Civilization and Peace, Seoul, Korea, December 2009 (proceedings)
“On Errors about One’s Own Current Mental State”, in Essays in Epistemology, (Roma Chakraborty, General Editor) Calcutta University, Department of Philosophy Publication, March, 2009.
“The Case of the Accusative: Contemporary Relevance of Bhartṛhari on the Kārakas”, in Bhartṛhari: Language, Thought and Reality, Mithilesh Chaturvedi, Motilal Banarsidass (eds), Delhi, 2009. 
“Play, Pleasure, Pain: Ownerless Emotions in Rasa-Aesthetics”, Chapter 14 in “Science, Literature and Aesthetics”, Professor Amiya Dev (ed), Vol. 40 in the Project of History of Indian Science, Philosophy and Culture, December, 2008.
“The Cool: Philosophy as Critique of Popular Culture”, in Proceedings of Conference on Popular Culture, Department of Philosophy, University of New Mexico, Albuquerque, 2007.
“Knowledge from Trusted Tellings and its Preventers”, in Shabdapramana, Edited Volume published by Department of Philosophy, North Bengal University, 2007.
“On What There Will Be: The Future in Quine” in Essays on Two Dogmas of Empiricism, book published by the Department of Philosophy, Rabindarbharati University, Kolkata, 2006.
“From Vimarsha to Vishrama: You, I, and the Tranquil Taste of Freedom” in Abhinavagupta: Reconsiderations, Makarand Paranjape and Sunther Visvulingam (eds), Samvad, India, 2006.
“Universal Properties in Indian Philosophy” in Macmillan Encyclopedia of Philosophy, December 2005.
“Manas: In Defense of the Inner Sense” in Towards a Spiritual Psychology, Rao and Bhatt Marwaha (ed), Samvad India Foundation, New Delhi, 2005.
“The Heart of Repose, the Repose of the Heart: A Phenomenological Analysis of the Concept of Visranti” in Samarasya, in Das and Furlinger D.K. (eds), Printworld, 2005.
“the Moral Psychology of Revenge”, in Journal of Human Values, Vol. 11, No. 1, Indian Institute of Management, Sage Publications, Calcutta, January 2005
“Seeing Without Recognizing? More of Denuding Perceptual Content”, in Philosophy East and West, Vol. 54, No. 3, 2004.
“Matter, Memory and the Unity of the Self”, in Life, Mind and Consciousness, The Ramakrishna Mission Institute of Culture, Gol Park, Kolkata, 2004.
“Faith, Faiths and the Future”, in Human Rights and Responsibility in the World Religions, Joseph Runzo, Nancy Marin and Arvind Sharma (eds), One World Press, October, 2003.
“Logic, Morals and Meditation: Tarka, Dharma, Yoga”, in EVAM, Vol. 13, Nos. 1 & 2, Samvad Foundation India, New Delhi, 2004.
“Perception, Apperception, and Non-Conceptual Content”, in Perspectives on Consciousness, Amita Chatterjee (ed), Munishiram Manoharlal Publishers, New Delhi, 2003.
“Of Greed, Gadgets, and Guests: The Future of Human Dwellings”, in Technology and Cultural Values, Peter Hershock, Marietta Stepaniants, Roger T. Ames (eds), University of Hawai’i Press, 2003.
“Analytic versus Comparative: A Bogus Dichotomy in Philosophy”, APA in Newsletter on Asian and Asian-American Philosophers and Philosophy, Vol. 2, No. 1, Fall 2002.
“The ‘Glory’ and ‘Impenetrability’ of the Peacock-egg”, in Bhartrhari and Wittgenstein, Sibajiban Bhattacharya (ed), Sahitya Akademi, New Delhi, 2002.
“In What Sense is Nyāya Realist?”, Third Round, in Journal of Indian Council of Philosophical Research, January–March, 2002.
“The Cloud of Pretending”, in FAITH: in The Age of Uncertainty, India International Center, New Delhi, January 2002. 
“Disgust and the Ugly in Classical Indian Aesthetics”, in Proceedings of the Italian Association for Aesthetics, Sienna, 2001.
“The Cosmic and Social Order of Eating”, in Ṛta: Cosmic Order and Chaos, Kapila Vatsyayana (ed), Indira Gandhi National Centre for the Arts, New Delhi, 2001.
“God as the Teacher, the Teacher as God”, in Vedanta: Concepts and Applications, Ramakrishna Mission Institute of Culture, Calcutta, March 2001. 
“Is Understanding Teachable” in The Empirical and the Transcendental, Bina Gupta (ed), Rowman and Littlefield, USA, 2000.
“Truth, Recognition of Truth, and Thoughtless Realism: Nyaya Without Fregean Fetters”, in Proceedings of the World Congress of Philosophy, Vol. XII, Boston, 2000.
“Against Immaculate Perception”, in Philosophy East and West, 50th Anniversary Issue, January, 2000.
“Keep Trying: Potter on Freedom Within Karma”, in Bulletin of the Ramakrishna Mission Institute of Culture, 2000.
“Debts and Dwellings: The Vedas and Levinas on the Ethical Metaphysics of Hospitality”, in Das Antlitz des “Andern”, Evangelishe Akademi, Loccum, Germany, 1999.
“But is Death an Evil?” and “Notes on Immortality” and “Death in Classical Indian Thought”, in Essays on Sofies Welt: Ein interreligioser Dialog über Geschichte, Philosophie und Wirklichkeit, Evangelische Akademie, Loccum, Germany, 1998.
“Telling as Letting Know”, in Philosophy of Language: The Big Questions, Andrea Nye (ed), Blackwell, Oxford, 1998.
“Concept Possession, Sense Experience and Knowledge of a Language”, in Philosophy of Sir Peter Strawson; Library of Living Philosophers, K.T. Hahn (ed), Open Court, USA, 1998.
“Shadows: The Ontology of Contoured Darkness”, Journal of the Indian Council of Philosophical Research, 1998.
“Nyāya Realism and the Sense-Reference Distinction”, Discussion Note, Journal of the Indian Council of Philosophical Research, July, 1997. 
“Seeing Daffodils, Seeing as Daffodils, Seeing Things Called “Daffodils””, in Relativism, Suffering and Beyond, J.N. Mohanty and P. Billimoria (ed), Oxford University Press, New Delhi, 1997.
"Meat and Morality in the Mahābhārata”, in Epistemology, Meaning and Metaphysics After Matilal, Arindam Chakrabarti (ed), Indian Institute of Advanced Studies, Shimla, 1997.
“Mind Body Dualism: A Philosophical Investigation”, New Delhi, 1997.
“On Not Dying”, in Indian Philosophical Quarterly (Special Issue on Descartes), Jan-April 1996.
“Kant in India”, in Proceedings of the Eleventh International Kant Congress, 1996.
“The Third Sense of Idealism”, in New Essays in the Philosophy of Sarvepalli Radhakrishnan, Ram Rao Pappu (ed), 1995.
“Is Nyāya Realist” in Journal of Indian Council of Philosophical Research, April 1995.
“Non-Particular Individuals”, in The Philosophy of Peter Strawson, P.K. Sen and R.R. Verma (eds), Allied Publishers & ICPR, Delhi, 1995.
“Sleep-Learning or Wake-up Call? Sruti-Sentences and Knowledge of Brahman”, in Essays in Honor of K.S. Murty, Ashok Vohra and Sibajiban Bhattacharya (eds), 1995.
“The Dark Mother Flying Kites: Ramakrishna’s Metaphysic of Morals”, Sophia, December, 1994.
“Testimony: A Philosophical Study”, Philosophy and Phenomenological Research, December 1994.
“Individual and Collective Pride”, American Philosophical Quarterly, January 1992.
“Idealist Refutations of Idealism”, Idealistic Studies, September 1992.
“I Touch What I Saw”, Philosophy and Phenomenological Research, March 1992.
“Blue and the Awareness of Blue”, Mind-Only School and Buddhist Logic, Rimpoche Doboom (ed), Tulku, Tibet House, New Delhi, 1990.
“Sentence-holism, Connected Designation and the Context Principle”, Journal of Indian Philosophy, September 1989.
“From the Fabric to the Weaver: The Cosmological Argument in Indian Philosophy”, Indian Philosophy of Religion, Roy Perrett (ed), Kluwer Academic Publishers, Holland, 1989.
“The End of Life”, Journal of Indian Philosophy, December 1988.
“What Makes Us Indian?”, in Composite Culture of India and National Integration, Rashiduddin Khan (ed), Indian Institute of Advanced Study, 1987. 
“On Understanding Falsehoods”, Journal of the Asiatic Society, Calcutta 1986.
“The Enigma of Existence: Hume, Kant and Frege”, Journal of the Department of Philosophy, Calcutta University, 1985.
“Plato’s Indian Barbers: Classical Indian Approaches to the Problem of Singular Existence Denials”, Analytical Philosophy in Comparative Perspective, Matilal and J.L. Shaw (eds), D. Reidel, Holland, 1985.
“Is Liberation Pleasant?” Philosophy East and West, Vol. 33, 1983.
“Two Problems in the Ontology of Fictional Discourse”, Journal of Indian Council of Philosophical Research, Vol. 1, No. 1, 1983.
“The Nyāya Proofs for the Existence of the Soul”, Journal of Indian Philosophy, 1982. “On What is Not”, Journal of the Indian Academy of Philosophy, Calcutta, 1977.

References

American philosophers
American male writers of Indian descent
Living people
University of Calcutta alumni
American male non-fiction writers
Year of birth missing (living people)